Ferdynand Goetel (15 May 1890 – 24 November 1960) was a Polish novelist, playwright, essayist, screen writer, and political activist; member of the prestigious Polish Academy of Literature from 1935; president of the Polish PEN Club as well as the Union of Polish Writers in interwar Poland. He established a prominent place in Polish literary circles between the wars and was the recipient of the "Golden Laurel" awarded by the Polish Academy of Literature for his contributions to Polish literature. He was forced to leave Poland after World War II due to his involvement in the German investigation of the Katyn massacre and died in exile in London.

Early years
Goetel was born at Sucha Beskidzka near Kraków. He attended schools in Kraków and Lvov but was not a model pupil; he later admitted in his memoirs that he was "considered wayward, rebellious, and even insolent," getting into trouble for secretly smoking cigars, gambling and distributing photographs of women. He was expelled from several schools. He was sent to a military school before ending up at the imperial Realschule (Szkoła realna), from which he graduated. Goetel subsequently went to Vienna to study architecture at the Vienna University of Technology, where his talent earned him a scholarship.

He moved back to Warsaw in 1912 but was arrested and interned by the Russian authorities at the outbreak of World War I, as he was an Austrian citizen in Russian-ruled Poland. The Russian authorities sent him to an internment camp at Tashkent in Turkestan, where he was put to work on road and bridge construction. After the Russian Revolution he served with the Red Army in the Caucasus for a while, an experience he subsequently used as the basis for his 1922 novel Kar Chat, about the Russian Civil War in the Caucasus. In December 1919, with the situation in Russia deteriorating and his newly married wife Jadwiga pregnant, he decided to make an escape to Poland. The journey took the couple fourteen months, via Persia, Afghanistan, India and England, before they arrived back in the now independent republic of Poland in January 1921.

Literary career during the inter-war years
Goetel's experiences in Russia prompted him to become a staunch anti-communist. The events of his internment, exile and escape were described in his memoir Przez płonący Wschód (Across The Burning East, 1923), and in his 1929 novel From Day to Day, about the Russian internment camp. He was elected president of the Polish Pen Club from 1926–33 and also served as president of the Trade Union of Polish Writers. In 1936 he was accepted as a member of the Polish Academy of Literature.

During the inter-war years Goetel wrote a number of novels and travel books that were well received. From Day to Day was translated into a number of languages and was filmed by Józef Lejtes. He also wrote for the theatre; his play Samuel Zborowski about the 1584 beheading of Samuel Zborowski was performed in Warsaw at Teatr Polski in 1929 with Marian Jednowski in the title role, and Kazimierz Junosza-Stępowski as King Stefan Batory.

Wartime years and exile
Goetel joined the Polish resistance movement Armia Krajowa (AK, or Home Army) in World War II, and was temporarily imprisoned in Pawiak by the SS. He has sometimes been described as the last victim of Katyn. He was blacklisted in communist Poland and driven out of the country in 1945 with an arrest warrant issued against him by the secret police, because the Germans arranged for him to participate in the original Katyn delegation on behalf of the AK, and also because in his postwar writings he demanded justice for the victims of Katyn. Goetel was proposed as a witness for the Katyn delegation by lawyer Ludwig Fischer, the German governor of Warsaw, but ultimately, the Polish delegation refused to help the Nazi propaganda efforts any further, and secretly informed the Polish government-in-exile about their findings.

The first arrest warrants against Goetel were issued in July 1945. For the next several months he stayed in hiding at the Carmelites convent in Kraków and then, in December 1945 escaped to Italy on a false passport. He joined the Army of General Anders and, at the conclusion of World War II, went to London. He lived there until his death in 1960. In exile, he wrote mostly memoirs and fiction based on his own life experiences.

His grave is located in the North Sheen Cemetery.

Works

See also
 Polish literature
 Polish literature during World War II
 Józef Mackiewicz, writer blacklisted in communist Poland for assisting in the first excavations of the mass graves of Polish soldiers killed by Soviet NKVD in the 1940 Katyn massacre

References

1890 births
1960 deaths
People from Sucha Beskidzka
Polish male writers
Polish publicists
Golden Laurel of the Polish Academy of Literature
Members of the Polish Academy of Literature
Polish expatriates in the United Kingdom
Burials at North Sheen Cemetery